Hafiz Hafeezur Rehman is a Pakistani politician who served as the 2nd Chief Minister of Gilgit-Baltistan and also leader of Pakistan's conservative political party PML-N, in Gilgit-Baltistan. He served in office from 26 June 2015 to 23 June 2020.

Early life
Rehman was born in Kashrote, Gilgit, Pakistan where he received his early education in Jamia Faridia madrassa, after that graduated from Punjab University which was later found fake and illegitimate . His elder brother Saif Rehman had been like a political alma mater for him, who played the key role in establishing Pakistan Muslim League-N in Gilgit-Baltistan. In 2003, Saif Rehman who was serving education, finance and revenue adviser in the then set-up, was assassinated in his hometown Kashrote near Gilgit city by his own close cousin.

Political career
Rehman had his political training in an informal way. Before joining PML-N, he had been attached with Jamiat Ulama-e-Islam. It was his brother's assassination that brought him into the formal political landscape of Gilgit-Baltistan. Rehman was previous elected Chief Minister of Gilgit-Baltistan and also leader of PML(N) Gilgit-Baltistan. Rehman was elected from the GBLA-2 constituency with a sizzling majority votes in 2015 Gilgit-Baltistan Assembly election.

He contested in 2020 Gilgit-Baltistan Assembly election from constituency GBLA-2, but lost.

See also 
 Politics of Pakistan

References 

People from Gilgit
Pakistan Muslim League (N) politicians
Chief Ministers of Gilgit-Baltistan
1972 births
Living people
Gilgit-Baltistan MLAs 2015–2020